The Park Bridge is a highway bridge in the Kicking Horse Canyon. The Trans-Canada Highway traverses the Kicking Horse River between Yoho National Park and Golden, British Columbia. This new bridge and the associated Ten Mile Hill section that was completed in 2007 and provided an upgrade to the old roadway.

History
In 1992, the province planned to replace the original two-lane Park Bridge with a four-lane divided  highway standard structure to reduce congestion and accidents, and increase passing opportunities. Construction began in 2004 and the new Park Bridge opened 21 months ahead of schedule when it was originally scheduled to open in August 2008. About 10,000 vehicles use this section daily; 24% of traffic is heavy truck traffic.

See also 
 List of bridges in Canada

References

External links
Kicking Horse Canyon Project
Ten Mile Hill and Park Bridge HD Video.

Bridges on the Trans-Canada Highway
Road bridges in British Columbia